KCSA-LP (97.1 FM) is a radio station licensed to San Angelo, Texas, United States and serving the San Angelo area. The station is currently owned by Concho Christmas Celebration.

References

External links
 

CSA-LP
CSA-LP
Radio stations established in 2003
Community radio stations in the United States